Eye railway station was located in Eye, Suffolk on a branch from Mellis. It was  down-line from London Liverpool Street. It was closed to passengers on 2 February 1931 and to goods on 13 July 1964.

In the 1840s, the town leaders of Eye unsuccessfully lobbied to have the new main line from London to Norwich run through Eye - instead, the line was routed through nearby Diss, which had an enormous effect on the prosperity and growth of that town. Eye got its own station on a later branch line, of much less importance, opening some time later.

References

External links
 Eye station on 1946 O. S. map

Disused railway stations in Suffolk
Former Great Eastern Railway stations
Railway stations in Great Britain opened in 1867
Railway stations in Great Britain closed in 1931
Railway station